Banjo Band, also known as Banjo Band Ivana Mládka, is a Czech country band formed in 1966 and led by singer and comedian Ivan Mládek. They are best known both at home and internationally for the song "Jožin z bažin".

Band members
Current members
 Ivan Mládek
 Jan Mrázek
 Lenka Šindelářová
 Lenka Plačková
 Milan Pitkin
 Libuše Roubychová

Past members
 Ivo Pešák

Selected discography
 Dobrý den! (1976)
 Nashledanou! 9 versions Panton 1977
 Ej, Mlhošu, Mlhošu! (1979)
 Předposlední leč (1981)
 Skupina Ivana Mládka (1983)
 Banjo, z pytle ven! (1985))
 Potůčku, nebublej! (1987)
 Ta country česká, ta je tak hezká (1991)
 Proč mě ženy nemaj rády (2002)
 ... a vo tom to je! (2002)
 Jožin z bažin w Polsce'' (2008)

References

External links

 
 

Czech country music groups